Sa Diskos Palios (Greek: Σαν Δίσκος Παληός; English: Like an old record) is the fourth studio album by Greek singer-songwriter and record producer Nikos Karvelas, released by CBS Records Greece in June 1985 and was certified gold in Greece. In 1996, a remastered version of the album was released.

Track listing

External links 
 Official site

1985 albums
Albums produced by Nikos Karvelas
Greek-language albums
Nikos Karvelas albums
Sony Music Greece albums